The 1935 Brisbane Rugby League premiership was the 27th season of Brisbane's semi-professional rugby league football competition. Six teams from across Brisbane competed for the premiership. The season culminated in Past Brothers defeating Fortitude Valley 11-9 in the grand final.

Ladder

Finals

References

Rugby league in Brisbane
Brisbane Rugby League season